Wo Ping San Tsuen is a village in Tuen Mun District, Hong Kong.

Administration
Wo Ping San Tsuen is one of the 36 villages represented within the Tuen Mun Rural Committee. For electoral purposes, Wo Ping San Tsuen is part of the Tuen Mun Rural constituency.

External links
 Delineation of area of existing village Wo Ping San Tsuen (Tuen Mun) for election of resident representative (2019 to 2022)

Villages in Tuen Mun District, Hong Kong